Bull Creek is a stream in Pennington County, South Dakota, in the United States. It is a tributary of the Cheyenne River.

Bull Creek was named from a buffalo bull which was seen stuck in the creek.

See also
List of rivers of South Dakota

References

Rivers of Pennington County, South Dakota
Rivers of South Dakota